Michael Sherman Wallace (born February 3, 1951), is a former Major League Baseball pitcher who played from  to  with four teams. He batted and threw left-handed. Wallace had an 11–3 record in 117 career games.

He was drafted by the Philadelphia Phillies in the 4th round (78th overall) of the 1969 amateur baseball draft out of James Madison High School in Vienna, Virginia.

Beginning in 2011, Wallace is a baseball pundit for the Mid-Atlantic Sports Network (MASN). Primarily covering the Washington Nationals, he appears on The Mid-Atlantic Sports Report and Nats Talk.

External links

1951 births
Living people
Major League Baseball pitchers
Baseball players from North Carolina
New York Yankees players
Philadelphia Phillies players
Texas Rangers players
St. Louis Cardinals players
Eugene Emeralds players
Miami Amigos players
People from Gastonia, North Carolina
Wallace
Arizona Instructional League Mesa players
Oklahoma City 89ers players
Pulaski Phillies players
Reading Phillies players
Rochester Red Wings players
Spartanburg Phillies players
Syracuse Chiefs players
Tucson Toros players
Tulsa Oilers (baseball) players